Anka may refer to:

 Anka (name), including a list of people and characters with the name
 Anka, Nigeria, a Local Government Area of Zamfara State
 Angströmquelle Karlsruhe (ANKA), a synchrotron facility at the Karlsruhe Institute of Technology in Germany
 ANKA news agency, based in Ankara, Turkey
 Anka Air or AnkAir, a Turkish charter airline from 2005 to 2008
 Anka SK, an Ankara-based Turkish ice hockey club
 Anka, a 1974 album by Canadian vocalist Paul Anka
 TAI Anka, a UAV developed by Turkish Aerospace Industries

See also
 El Hadj M'Hamed El Anka (1907-1978), Algerian musician
 Anqa, a legendary bird
 ANCA (disambiguation)

ja:アンカ